Spencer Highway (route B89) is a highway along the east coast of Spencer Gulf in South Australia. It runs south from Augusta Highway through Port Pirie to Minlaton.

Major intersections

References

Highways in South Australia
Yorke Peninsula